In enzymology, a cob(II)alamin reductase is an enzyme that catalyzes the chemical reaction

2 cob(I)alamin + NAD+  2 cob(II)alamin + NADH + H+

Thus, the two substrates of this enzyme are cob(I)alamin and NAD+, whereas its 3 products are cob(II)alamin, NADH, and H+.

This enzyme belongs to the family of oxidoreductases, specifically those oxidizing metal ion with NAD+ or NADP+ as acceptor.  The systematic name of this enzyme class is cob(I)alamin:NAD+ oxidoreductase. Other names in common use include vitamin B12r reductase, B12r reductase, and NADH2:cob(II)alamin oxidoreductase.  This enzyme participates in porphyrin and chlorophyll metabolism.  It employs one cofactor, FAD.

References

 

EC 1.16.1
NADH-dependent enzymes
Flavoproteins
Enzymes of unknown structure